The following is a timeline of the history of the city of Toulouse, France.

Prior to 18th century

 106 BCE - Romans in power.

 3rd C. CE - Roman Catholic Diocese of Toulouse established.
 250 - Martyrdom of Saint Saturnin, first bishop of Toulouse.
 413 - Toulouse taken by forces of Visigoth Ataulf.
 419 - Wallia makes Toulouse the capital of the Visigothic Kingdom.
 439 - Battle of Toulouse (439)
 458 - Battle of Toulouse (458)
 508 - Clovis I in power.
 631 - Toulouse becomes capital of the Duchy of Aquitaine.
 715-720 - Besieged by the Saracens.
 721 - Battle of Toulouse (721).
 767 - Siege of Toulouse (767)
 778
 Torson becomes count of Toulouse.
 Toulouse becomes capital of the County of Toulouse.
 780/781 - Charlemagne appoints his little son Louis the Pious king of Aquitaine, with Toulouse for his chief city.
 Late 9th C - Counts of Toulouse in power.
 844 - Battle of Toulouse (844)
 850 - Troubadours active (approximate date).
 1060 - Basilica of St. Sernin construction begins.
 1180 -  opens (approximate date).
 1215 - Saint Dominic creates a community of friars in Toulouse, approved by the pope in 1216 which gives it the name of Order of Preachers.
 1218 - Siege of Toulouse (1217–18).
 1219 - .
 1229
 University of Toulouse established.
 Inquisition begins.
 1286 - Augustinian convent (Toulouse) founded.
 1295 - Creation of the Handwritten Annals of the City of Toulouse.
 1302 - Parliament established.
 1323 - Consistori del Gay Saber founded.
 1324 - Floral Games poetry contest begins.
 1332 - Population: 45,000 (approximate).
 1347 - Black Death plague.
 1369 - Translation of the relics of Saint Thomas Aquinas in the Church of the Jacobins.
 1443 - Creation of the Parliament of Toulouse by king Charles VII of France.
 1463 - Fire.
 1529 -  housed in a tower at the Capitole.
 1549 - Château Narbonnais dismantled.
 1562
 1562 Riots of Toulouse.
 Hôtel d'Assézat completed.
 1632 - Pont Neuf (bridge) built.
 1640 - Société des Lanternistes formed.
 1681 - Canal du Midi begins operating.

18th-19th centuries
 1726 - Art school opens.
 1746 -  established.
 1754 - Jardin Royal and  parks created.
 1760 - Capitole de Toulouse rebuilt.
 1772 -  (library) established.
 1776 - Canal de Brienne begins operating.
 1781
  created.
 Brouilhet's reading room opens.
 1790 - Toulouse becomes part of the Haute-Garonne souveraineté.
 1793 - Population: 52,612.
 1794 - Jardin des Plantes established.
 1795 - Musée des Augustins opens.

 1803 - Chamber of Commerce established.
 1814 - 10 April: Battle of Toulouse (1814).
 1818 - Théâtre du Capitole opens.
 1828 - France Meridionale newspaper begins publication.
 1844 -  (bridge) built.
 1851 - Population: 95,277.
 1852 -  (bridge) built.
 1856 - Toulouse railway network established.
 1860 - Basilica of Saint-Sernin restored by Eugène Viollet-le-Duc.
 1862 -  begins operating.
 1865 - Natural history Muséum de Toulouse opens.
 1870 - La Dépêche de Toulouse newspaper begins publication.
 1874 -  cafe established.
 1876 - Population: 131,642.
 1886 - Population: 147,617.
 1887 - Jardin botanique Henri Gaussen (garden) established.
 1892 - Musée Saint-Raymond opens.
 1895 -  newspaper begins publication.

20th century

1900s-1940s
 1903
 July: 1903 Tour de France bicycle race passes through Toulouse.
 Toulouse Business School established.
 1906 - Population: 125,856 town; 149,438 commune.
 1907 -  founded.
 1910 -  built.
 1911 - Population: 149,576.
 1935 -  (library) built.
 1936 - Population: 213,220.
 1937
 Toulouse Football Club formed.
 Stadium Municipal opens.

1950s-2000
 1953 - Toulouse–Blagnac Airport terminal opens.
 1962
 Toulouse twinned with Tel Aviv, Israel.
 Population: 323,724.
 1964 -  and  established.
 1968 - Toulouse Space Center established in nearby Montaudran.
 1970 - Toulouse FC (football team) formed.
 1971 -  becomes mayor.
 1975 - Toulouse twinned with Atlanta, United States; and Kiev, Ukraine.
 1978 -  established.
 1981
 Orchestre national du Capitole de Toulouse active.
  established.
 Toulouse twinned with Bologna, Italy; Chongqing, China; and Elche, Spain.
 1982 -  established.
 1983 - Dominique Baudis becomes mayor.
 1985 - Socialist Party national congress held in Toulouse.
 1988 -  opens.
 1993
 Toulouse Metro begins operating.
  opens.
 1994 - Bemberg Foundation moves into the Hôtel d'Assézat.
 1997 - Cité de l'espace theme park opens.
 1999
  auditorium opens.
 Population: 390,350.

21st century
2000s
 2001
 21 September: Toulouse chemical factory explosion.
 Community of Agglomeration of Greater Toulouse created.
 2004 - Médiathèque José Cabanis (library) opens.
 2009
 Urban community of Greater Toulouse created.
 Aeronautical literary festival begins.

2010s
 2010 - Toulouse tramway begins operating.
 2012
 March: 2012 Toulouse shootings.
 October: Socialist Party national congress held in Toulouse again.
 Population: 461,190.
 2014
 March:  held.
 Jean-Luc Moudenc becomes mayor.
 2015 - December:  held.
 2016 - Toulouse becomes part of the Occitanie region.

See also
 History of Toulouse
 
 List of counts of Toulouse 770s-1270s
 List of mayors of Toulouse
 
  department
  region

Other cities in the Occitanie region:
 Timeline of Montpellier
 Timeline of Nimes
 Timeline of Perpignan

ReferencesThis article incorporates information from the French Wikipedia.''

Bibliography

in English

in French
 
 
  (began annual publication in the 1750s)
 
 
 
 
 
  + contents

External links

 Items related to Toulouse, various dates (via Europeana)
 Items related to Toulouse, various dates (via Digital Public Library of America)

Toulouse